Fargesia Rufa, sometimes also sold under the name Gansu 95-1 or incorrectly as Fargesia rufa (which is a distinct species), is a commonly cultivated form of bamboo. Its origin is somewhat mysterious, but morphological evidence seems to suggest that it is a cultivar of Fargesia dracocephala. It was introduced into the western horticultural trade in 1995 from the Gansu Province in northwest China.

References

Gallery

Fargesia
Ornamental plant cultivars